Bertie Ernest Hawkes Whitcombe (1875–1963) was a notable New Zealand printer, bookseller and publisher. He was born in Christchurch, North Canterbury, New Zealand in 1875.

References

1875 births
1963 deaths
New Zealand publishers (people)
People from Christchurch
New Zealand booksellers